Library Hotel by Library Hotel Collection is a 60-room boutique hotel in New York City, located at 299 Madison Avenue (at 41st Street), near the New York Public Library Main Branch, Bryant Park, and Grand Central Terminal. The hotel was designed by architect Stephen B. Jacobs.

Library Hotel by Library Hotel Collection boasts a unique organizing principle: each of its ten guest floors has a theme, designated after a major category of the Dewey Decimal Classification (the 5th floor, for example, is the 500s, the Sciences), with each room as a subcategory or genre, such as Mathematics (Room 500.001) or Botany (Room 500.004). (Dewey categories 000, 100, and 200 are placed on the 10th, 11th, and 12th floors, respectively.) Other room themes include Erotic Literature (Room 800.001), Poetry (Room 800.003), and Music (Room 700.005). All rooms have a small complement of 50–100 books and decorations that accompany the theme, with 6,000 books overall throughout the hotel.

Because of this classification scheme, the hotel owners were sued in 2003 by the OCLC (owners of the Dewey Decimal Classification system). OCLC reached an agreement with the hotel enabling the hotel to continue using the Dewey system.

The Library Hotel is owned and operated by Henry Kallan, whose Library Hotel Collection includes Manhattan's Casablanca Hotel, Hotel Giraffe and Hotel Elysee.

References

Hotels in Manhattan
Library cataloging and classification
Midtown Manhattan